FreeBMD is a UK-based charitable organisation and website founded in 1998, and established as charity in 2003 to create a free transcription of the indexes to Births, Marriages and Deaths (BMD) for England and Wales from 1837 to 1983. It also provides on-line access to images of the pages of the BMD indexes. Since 2014 FreeBMD has been part of Free UK Genealogy.

History
FreeBMD was founded in 1998 by Ben Laurie, Graham Hart and Camilla Von Massenbach, with the intention of creating a searchable version of the General Register Office indexes of England and Wales. The three founders were joined in 1999 by Dave Mayall. The project became a registered charity in 2003.

In 2005, FreeBMD absorbed the formerly separate, but closely allied, projects FreeCEN and FreeREG, bringing all three projects under a single trustee body, while retaining autonomous day-to-day management. In 2014, the name was changed to Free UK Genealogy, to better reflect their aims. In 2016, it became a Charitable Incorporated Organisation (CIO).

, FreeBMD has transcribed over 288 million distinct records, which represents the overwhelming majority of births, marriages and deaths registered in England and Wales from 1837 to 1997.

In 2015 Dr Pat Reynolds was appointed executive director, in succession to Darren Wright.

Activities
FreeBMD is engaged in an ongoing project to transcribe the General Register Office (GRO) of England and Wales indexes of Births, Marriages and Deaths. In 1999 they secured an agreement with the GRO to publish records that were more than 100 years old and initially concentrated on transcribing the marriage indexes, with births and deaths to a lesser degree. However, in 2003 the GRO agreed an open policy to transcribe all of the data and, since that time FreeBMD has transcribed births, marriages and deaths for later years. FreeBMD uses volunteer transcribers. By 2018 over 12000 volunteers had helped the project, transcribing from microfiches of the original register pages and also submitting individual entries. Most transcriptions for FreeBMD are created using specially-written safe software WinBMD and BMDVerify available from the FreeBMD website.

Membership
The organisation's facilities are available to all without the need to become a member. Those who transcribe data for the project sign up for membership online, in order to allow access to the relevant facilities.

Awards and reputation
In 2007, FreeBMD was awarded the Prince Michael of Kent Award by the Society of Genealogists.  The same year, The Guardian selected FreeBMD as one of the 50 best "family history" websites.

References

External links
 

Family history societies in the United Kingdom
British genealogy websites